The Juche calendar, named after the Juche ideology, is the system of year-numbering used in North Korea. It begins with the birth of Kim Il-sung, the founder of North Korea. His birth year, 1912 in the Gregorian calendar, is "Juche 1" in the Juche calendar. The calendar was adopted in 1997, three years after the death of Kim Il-sung.

History 
The calendar borrows elements from two historical calendars used in Korea, the traditional system of Korean era names and the Gregorian calendar in which years are tied to the traditional birth of Jesus. In contrast to these two, the Juche calendar begins with the birth of the founder of the Democratic People's Republic, Kim Il-sung.

The decree on the Juche calendar was adopted on 8 July 1997, on the third anniversary of the death of Kim Il-sung. The same decree also designated the birth anniversary of Kim Il-sung as the Day of the Sun. The birth year of Kim Il-sung, 1912 in the Gregorian calendar, became "Juche 1" in the North Korean calendar.

The calendar began to be implemented on 9 September 1997, the Day of the Foundation of the Republic. On that date, newspapers, news agencies, radio stations, public transport, and birth certificates began to use Juche years.

Usage 
The year 1912 is "Juche 1" in the North Korean calendar. There are no "before Juche" years; years before 1912 are given numbers based on the Gregorian calendar only. Ranges of years that begin before 1912 and end after it are also given in Christian calendar numbers only.

Any other years after 1912 will be given in either Juche years only, or in Juche years and the corresponding year in the Christian calendar in parentheses. In material pertaining to relations with foreign countries, "the Juche Era and the Christian Era may be used on the principles of independence, equality and reciprocity."

The Juche calendar is a popular souvenir among tourists visiting North Korea.

Examples

See also 

 Public holidays in North Korea
 Republic of China calendar, currently used in Taiwan, whose year numbers match those of the Juche calendar (for unrelated reasons).
 The years in Japan's Taishō era (30 July 1912 to 25 December 1926) also coincided with those of the Juche calendar.

References

External links 
 Example of "Juche 103 (2014)" from Pyongyang University of Science and Technology

1997 introductions
North Korean culture
Calendars
Modified Gregorian calendars
1997 establishments in North Korea